Colin Kitching (11 November 1933 – 14 March 2022) was an Australian former soccer player.

Kitching played club football in Queensland, firstly in Ipswich at Bundamba, Blackstone United, and St Helens United before moving to Brisbane when he joined Hellenic. He won Queensland premierships 5 times: in 1953 with Blackstone United, in 1955 and 1957 with Bundamba, and in 1960 and 1963 with Hellenic. Kitching died in March 2022.

Kitching was a member of the Australian team at the 1956 Summer Olympics.

References

1936 births
Australian soccer players
Footballers at the 1956 Summer Olympics
Olympic soccer players of Australia
Living people
Association football forwards
Australia international soccer players